Jeong Ji-won, better known by the stage name Wonstein is a South Korean rapper and singer. He debuted in 2018 with the single "Spider Web" under the label Beautiful Noise. He achieved mainstream popularity after participating on the hip-hop competition show Show Me the Money 9 in 2020. The following year, he appeared on the reality show Hangout with Yoo, through which he became a member of the chart-topping R&B supergroup MSG Wannabe.

Discography

Extended plays

Singles

Soundtrack appearances

Other charted songs

Filmography

Television

Ambassadorship 
 Public relations ambassador for Save the Children (2022)

Awards and nominations

Notes

References

External links 

 

Living people
People from Cheongju
South Korean male rappers
South Korean male singers
Show Me the Money (South Korean TV series) contestants
Year of birth missing (living people)